The inaugural BRIC summit took place in Yekaterinburg, Russia on June 16, 2009. The four heads of government from the BRIC countries attended.

Overview
The acronym BRIC (for Brazil, Russia, India, China) was first used in a Goldman Sachs thesis projecting that the economic potential of Brazil, Russia, India and China is such that they may become among the five most dominant economies by the year 2050. Today, the four countries produce about 15 percent of the world’s gross domestic product and hold about 40 percent of the gold and hard currency reserves.

Political dialogue between the BRIC countries began in New York in September 2006, with a meeting of the BRIC foreign ministers. Four high-level meetings have followed, including a full-scale meeting in Yekaterinburg, Russia, on May 16, 2008.

Participants

The heads of state and heads of government of the four countries participated.

Gallery of participating leaders

Issues
The leaders discussed the current global financial crisis, global development, and further strengthening of the BRIC group.

World economy
The BRIC leaders called for increased economic reform, demanding a "greater voice and representation in international financial institutions, and their heads and senior leadership should be appointed through an open, transparent and merit-based selection process."

They urged the international community to push for comprehensive results of the Doha Round.

Political issues
Amongst the important issues discussed were United Nations reform. "We reiterate the importance we attach to the status of India and Brazil in international affairs, and understand and support their aspirations to play a greater role in the United Nations."

Food crisis
Regarding the 2007–2008 world food price crisis, the leaders issued a joint statement on global food security, calling for "action by all governments and the relevant international agencies"; and reaffirmed "their commitment to contribute to the efforts to overcome the global food crisis".

References

External links
First BRIC summit Official website
The Sino-Brazilian Principles in a Latin American and BRICS Context: The Case for Comparative Public Budgeting Legal Research Wisconsin International Law Journal, 13 May 2015

01
Diplomatic conferences in Russia
21st-century diplomatic conferences (BRICS)
2009 in Russia
2009 in international relations
2009 conferences
Yekaterinburg
June 2009 events in Russia